Winchester College Ground is a cricket ground in Winchester, Hampshire.  The ground is the historic grounds of Winchester College, with evidence suggesting cricket in Winchester dates back to the 17th century.  The present ground, which is also known as New Field or Ridding Field, dates from 1869 when the then headmaster George Ridding bought land south of "meads" and donated it to the college.  In 1875, the ground held was is to date the only first-class match to be played there when Hampshire played Kent in 1875.  Hampshire, who were captained by Clement Booth, were dismissed for just 34 in their first-innings.  In response, Kent were dismissed for 333, giving them a lead of 299.  Hampshire fared little better in their second-innings, making just 82 to lose the match by an innings and 217 runs.

Until 1888 the pitch lay east–west, after which it was moved to lay north–south, a position retained to this day.  The ground is used by the College for matches against Eton College and Harrow School, as well as being used by the Old Wykehamist Cricket Club.

See also
List of Hampshire County Cricket Club grounds

References

External links
Winchester College Ground at CricketArchive
Winchester College Ground at ESPNcricinfo

Hampshire County Cricket Club
Cricket grounds in Hampshire
Winchester College
Sports venues completed in 1869
1869 establishments in England